Joseph König may refer to:
 Joseph König (theologian)
 Joseph König (chemist)